David Wagner defeated Andrew Lapthorne in the final, 7–5, 3–6, 6–4 to win the quad singles wheelchair tennis title at the 2017 US Open.

Dylan Alcott was the defending champion from when the event was last held in 2015, but was eliminated in the round-robin stage.

The event was not held in 2016 due to a scheduling conflict with the 2016 Summer Paralympics.

Draw

Final

Round robin
Standings are determined by: 1. number of wins; 2. number of matches; 3. in two-players-ties, head-to-head records; 4. in three-players-ties, percentage of sets won, or of games won; 5. steering-committee decision.

External links
 Draw

Wheelchair Quad Singles
U.S. Open, 2017 Quad Singles